Calum Thomas Bowen (born 26 February 1991), also known professionally as Bo En (stylized as bo en), is an English musician and video game producer based in London.

Career
Bowen released his debut album titled Pale Machine in 2013. In 2014, Bowen's remix of "My Party" by Kero Kero Bonito was featured on their Bonito Recycling EP. Over the course of the following years he wrote three singles, "By the Phone", "sometimes" and "love in a song". In 2021, Bowen released a satirical remix of "love in a song", titled "love in a song - DJ HEARTBREAK ANNIHILATION MIX". In February 2023, Bowen announced that he is writing new songs together with Babymorocco. It is currently unknown how many songs they are producing, however three of them appear to be called "Love Wont Find U", "When We Were Young" and "idk_if_i_feel_enough".

Video game composing
Under his real name Calum Bowen (stylized as calum bowen) he wrote the soundtrack to Up Up Ubie and Super Ubie Land. He then continued to write songs for smaller games such as Marble Time, Thief Story and Winnose. Bowen later composed the soundtrack for the 2014 game Lovely Planet, followed by Lovely Planet Arcade and Lovely Planet 2: April Skies. He also composed the soundtrack for Pikuniku, which was released in 2019, along with three songs for Omori, released in late 2020. One of the three songs composed for Omori was a pitched-up version of "My Time", a song which was initially included in his debut album Pale Machine, in 2013. The Omori soundtrack was expanded in 2022, with the addition of two new songs featured in the console version of the game, which were also composed by Bowen. Bowen composed the music for Voyage, which was released in 2021. In addition to composing the music for Voyage, which was released in 2021, he produced the soundtrack for Netflix' Poinpy, a free mobile game released in 2022.

Discography

Studio albums
Pale Machine (2013, Maltine)

Singles
By the Phone (2015)
sometimes (2016)
love in a song (2018)

Video game soundtracks
Marble Time (2013)
Up Up Ubie 
Super Ubie Land (2013)
Thief Story
Winnose (2014)
Lovely Planet (2014)
Lovely Planet Arcade (2016)
Pakka Pets (2016)
Snipperclips (2017)
Pikuniku (2019)
Lovely Planet 2: April Skies (2019)
Crossy Road Castle (2020)
Omori  (2020) 
Voyage (2021)
Poinpy (2022)

Video game sound design
Valdis Story: Abyssal City (2013)
Dragon: A Game About a Dragon (2015)
Lovely Planet: Arcade (2016)
Pikuniku (2019)
Tangle Tower (2019)

References

Musicians from London
1991 births
21st-century English musicians
English composers
English record producers
Living people
Video game composers